The 2018 KBO League season was the 37th season in the history of the KBO League.

Standings

Source

League Leaders

Foreign players
Each team can sign up to three foreign players. Due to the high proportion of pitchers signed in previous years, beginning in 2014 the league has mandated that at least one of the foreign players must be a position player.

Foreign hitters

Postseason

Wild Card
The series started with a 1–0 advantage for the fourth-placed team.

Semi-Playoff

Playoff

Korean Series

Attendances

References

KBO League seasons
KBO League season
KBO League season